Killington Peak is the second highest summit in the Green Mountains and in the U.S. state of Vermont. It is located east of Rutland in south-central Vermont. Killington Peak is a stop on the Long Trail, which here shares its route with the Appalachian Trail. Traveling southbound on the Trail, it is the last  peak close to the trail until Virginia.

A ski resort, Killington Ski Resort, nicknamed "the beast of the east", is located on the mountain. A gondola transports skiers and non-hikers to the summit in winter, summer, and during fall color season. There is a lodge near the peak which is complete with a restaurant and bar with panoramic views.

In 1763, the mountain was known as Pisgah. Killington (a.k.a. Sherburne) lodging situations have changed over the years, from sleeping on barroom floors and barns on the mountain road, traveling up from nearby Rutland or Woodstock, to the present day, in which the vicinity has over 120 inns, lodges, and condominium complexes. Their sleeping capacity brings this Central Vermont region's tourist population to 60,000+ on prime winter weekends.

Gallery

References

External links 
 
 Killington Vermont Official Town Website
 Killington Vermont Chamber of Commerce Website
 Discover Killington
 
 Killington Ski Resort
 Killington Ski Tours - Est. 1968

Mountains of Vermont
New England Four-thousand footers
Mountains on the Appalachian Trail
Mountains of Rutland County, Vermont
Tourist attractions in Rutland County, Vermont